The European Journal of Palliative Care is the official journal of the European Association for Palliative Care. It publishes articles on the latest advances in palliative care in Europe and facilitate communication between healthcare professionals working in the field.

The founding editor was Geoffrey Hanks.

References

External links 
 

Publications established in 1994
Anesthesiology and palliative medicine journals
Bimonthly journals
English-language journals